The 1999 European Parliament election in Austria was the election of the delegation from Austria to the European Parliament in 1999.

Results

References

Austria
European Parliament elections in Austria
1999 elections in Austria